The Pink Panther is an American media franchise primarily focusing on a series of comedy-mystery films featuring an inept French police detective, Inspector Jacques Clouseau. The franchise began with the release of the classic film The Pink Panther in 1963. The role of Clouseau was originated by and is most closely associated with Peter Sellers. Most of the films were written and directed by Blake Edwards, with theme music composed by Henry Mancini. Elements and characters inspired by the films were adapted into other media, including books, comic books, video games and animated series.

The first film in the series derives its name from a pink diamond that has enormous size and value. The diamond is called the "Pink Panther" because the flaw at its center, when viewed closely, is said to resemble a leaping pink panther. The phrase reappears in the title of the fourth film The Return of the Pink Panther, in which the theft of the diamond is again the center of the plot. The phrase was used for all the subsequent films in the series, even when the jewel did not figure in the plot. The jewel ultimately appeared in six of the 11 films.

The first film in the series had an animated opening sequence, created by DePatie–Freleng Enterprises, featuring "The Pink Panther Theme" by Mancini, as well as the Pink Panther character. This character, designed by Hawley Pratt and Friz Freleng, was subsequently the subject of his own series of theatrical cartoons, beginning with The Pink Phink in 1964. The cartoon series gained its highest profile on television, aired on Saturday mornings as The Pink Panther Show.

The character was featured in the opening of every Clouseau film except A Shot in the Dark and Inspector Clouseau.

Films

Original series

The Pink Panther (1963)

The Pink Panther (1963), the original film of the series, centered on the Phantom/Sir Charles Lytton, portrayed by David Niven.  Set in the ski resort of Cortina d'Ampezzo. Peter Sellers's performance was so popular that the resulting series was built on the Clouseau character, rather than the Phantom character. Niven and Sellers's co-stars included Capucine, Robert Wagner, and Claudia Cardinale.

A Shot in the Dark (1964)

A Shot in the Dark (1964) was released less than a year after The Pink Panther, and was the first to feature the Clouseau character as the protagonist of the film, investigating a murder set in a mansion in Paris. This film marked the first appearance of many of the tropes and supporting characters long associated with the series, including Commissioner Dreyfus (portrayed by Herbert Lom), his assistant François (portrayed by André Maranne), and Clouseau's manservant, Cato (portrayed by Burt Kwouk). Elke Sommer, George Sanders, Graham Stark, Tracy Reed and Douglas Wilmer also appeared in the film.

Inspector Clouseau (1968)

The 1968 film Inspector Clouseau stars Alan Arkin as Clouseau, and does not feature any other recurring characters from the rest of the series. Although it was produced by the Mirisch Corporation (who owned the rights to the Pink Panther and Clouseau characters), key people associated with the earlier films, such as Peter Sellers, Blake Edwards, and Henry Mancini, were not involved in the making of this film.

The Return of the Pink Panther (1975)

More than a decade after his previous portrayal, Peter Sellers returned as Clouseau in 1975's The Return of the Pink Panther.  The film marked the return of the famous "Pink Panther" diamond as well as most of the creative team associated with the prior films, including director Blake Edwards, composer Henry Mancini, Herbert Lom as Dreyfus, Burt Kwouk as Cato and André Maranne as François. David Niven did not reprise the role of Sir Charles Lytton, who is portrayed in the film by Christopher Plummer instead. The film also co-starred Catherine Schell, Peter Arne, and Graham Stark.

The Pink Panther Strikes Again (1976)

In The Pink Panther Strikes Again (1976), Dreyfus' insanity reached its zenith, as he tried to blackmail the rest of the world into killing Clouseau. It co-starred Leonard Rossiter, Lesley-Anne Down, Michael Robbins, Colin Blakely, and featured an uncredited cameo by Omar Sharif.

Revenge of the Pink Panther (1978)

Revenge of the Pink Panther (1978) pitted Clouseau against the French Connection. It is the last in which Sellers played Clouseau. He died two years after its release. It co-starred Dyan Cannon, Robert Webber, Robert Loggia and Graham Stark.

Trail of the Pink Panther (1982)

Trail of the Pink Panther (1982) was the first Pink Panther film made after Peter Sellers' death in 1980.  Sellers' role is created by using scenes cut from Strikes Again, as well as flashbacks from the previous Pink Panther films. This movie was intended as a tribute to Sellers, but after its release, Sellers' widow Lynne Frederick successfully sued Edwards and Metro-Goldwyn-Mayer for tarnishing her late husband's memory. David Niven and Capucine reprise their original roles from the first Pink Panther film. Trail was a critical and commercial failure.

Curse of the Pink Panther (1983)

1983's Curse of the Pink Panther is the first to feature a different lead character, blundering American detective Sgt. Clifton Sleigh, portrayed by Ted Wass.  Inspector Clouseau and the Pink Panther diamond, both of which had disappeared in Trail, are pursued by Sleigh.  Clouseau returns, after having plastic surgery to disguise his identity, in a cameo appearance by Roger Moore (who is credited as "Turk Thrust II"). Although intended to spawn a new series of misadventures for the inept Sergeant Sleigh, the film's dismal box-office performance and critical drubbing, along with a complicated series of lawsuits between Edwards and Metro-Goldwyn-Mayer, led to a decade-long hiatus of the series. The lawsuit was eventually settled out of court in 1988, around the time Edwards came up with one final film idea that would ultimately become the unofficial series finale.

Son of the Pink Panther (1993)

In Son of the Pink Panther (1993), Blake Edwards made one final attempt to revive the Pink Panther series, this time by casting Italian actor Roberto Benigni as Gendarme Jacques Gambrelli, Inspector Clouseau's illegitimate son by Maria Gambrelli, the murder suspect from A Shot in the Dark (1964). Once again, regular Panther co-stars return – Herbert Lom, Burt Kwouk, and Graham Stark, and a star of the original 1963 film, Claudia Cardinale. Although intended to relaunch the series with the blundering Jacques as a lead, Son failed both critically and commercially and became the final installment in the original Pink Panther series. It was also the final film for both retiring director Blake Edwards and composer Henry Mancini, who died in 1994.

Reboot series

The Pink Panther (2006)

This reboot launches a new Pink Panther film series starring Steve Martin as Inspector Clouseau and Kevin Kline as Chief Inspector Dreyfus. Not a remake of the original film, it forms a new starting point for a contemporary series, introducing the Clouseau and Dreyfus characters along with the famous diamond to a new generation.

The film was panned by most critics, but was a financial success, grossing $164.1 million against an $80 million budget.

The Pink Panther 2 (2009)

The sequel to Steve Martin's 2006 film. Martin reprises his role, but John Cleese replaces Kevin Kline as Chief Inspector Dreyfus.

This film received negative reviews and unlike its predecessor only had meager box office success. It grossed a worldwide total of $76 million, against a budget of $70 million.

Second reboot
On March 31, 2014, Metro-Goldwyn-Mayer announced plans to develop a new live-action/CGI hybrid feature film starring The Pink Panther, which was to be directed by David Silverman (of Simpsons fame) and produced by Walter Mirisch and Julie Andrews (who, in addition to her many career accomplishments, is Blake Edwards' widow). Unlike most previous films, this film will not be focused on Inspector Clouseau, but instead on the titular cartoon character himself. However, on November 19, 2020, a CGI animated / live-action hybrid Pink Panther film was officially announced with Jeff Fowler directing the feature instead of Silverman and Chris Bremner developing the script, though the film will still be produced by Julie Andrews, Walter Mirisch, and his son Lawrence Mirisch. The film is also executive produced by Ryan Halprin. It was also announced that the film will focus on both the Pink Panther himself and Inspector Clouseau.

Main cast and characters

Recurring cast members

Additional crew and production details

Production

Development

20th-century film series
Most of the films in the series starred Peter Sellers as Inspector Clouseau and were directed and co-written by Blake Edwards. As detailed in the director's commentary for the first film, the Inspector Clouseau character was originally conceived as a vehicle for David Niven, but once written it was decided he should play the raconteur/thief. Then the role was offered to Peter Ustinov, with Ava Gardner to play his wife. When Gardner dropped out, so did Ustinov, so the role of Clouseau went to Sellers. Apparently, the tone of the film changed after Edwards picked up Sellers from the airport, and during the ride to the hotel, they bonded over their mutual love of old film comedians like Harold Lloyd, Buster Keaton and Laurel & Hardy. The role was then modified to include elements of slapstick. The jazz-based Pink Panther Theme was composed by Henry Mancini. In addition to the credits sequences, the theme often accompanies any suspenseful sequence in the first film and in most of the subsequent films featuring the character of Clouseau.

The "Pink Panther" of the title is a diamond supposedly containing a flaw that forms the image of a "leaping panther" which can be seen if held up to the light in a certain way. This is explained at the beginning of the first film, and the camera zooms in on the diamond to reveal the blurry flaw, which focuses on the cartoon Panther (though not actually leaping) to begin the opening credits sequence. (This is also done in The Return of the Pink Panther [1975].) The plot of the first film is based on the theft of this diamond. The diamond reappears in several later films in the series, The Return of the Pink Panther (1975), Trail of the Pink Panther (1982) and Curse of the Pink Panther (1983). It also appears in the revival of the Inspector Clouseau character in the Steve Martin reboot films The Pink Panther (2006), and its sequel The Pink Panther 2 (2009). The name "the Pink Panther" became attached to Inspector Clouseau in much the same way that Frankenstein has been used in film titles to refer to Dr. Frankenstein's creation, or The Thin Man was used in a series of detective films.

A Shot in the Dark, the second film in the series, was not originally intended to feature Clouseau and is the first of two films in the series (the other being Inspector Clouseau) that features neither the diamond nor the distinctive animated Pink Panther character in the opening credits and ending. Many critics, including Leonard Maltin, regard A Shot in the Dark as the best film in the series.

In the original film, released in 1963, the main focus was on David Niven's role as Sir Charles Litton, the infamous jewel thief nicknamed "the Phantom", and his plan to steal the Pink Panther diamond. Inspector Clouseau was only a secondary character as Litton's incompetent antagonist and provided slapstick to an otherwise subtle, lighthearted caper film, a somewhat jarring contrast of styles which is typical of Edwards's films. The popularity of Clouseau caused him to become the main character in subsequent Pink Panther films, which were more straightforward slapstick comedies.

Mancini's theme, with variations in arrangement, is used at the start of all but the first two of the subsequent films. Mancini's other themes for the first film include an Italian-language set-piece called "Meglio stasera", whose purpose seems primarily to introduce young actress Fran Jeffries. Portions of an instrumental version also appear in the film's musical score several times. Other segments include "Shades of Sennett", a "honky-tonk" piano number introducing the film's climactic chase scene through the streets of Rome. Most of the remaining tracks on the soundtrack album are the early 1960s orchestral jazz pieces, matching the style of the era. Although variations of the main theme would reprise for many of the Pink Panther series entries, as well as the cartoon series, Mancini composed different theme music for A Shot in the Dark; this theme was later adopted by the animated spin-off series The Inspector.

Although official, the live-action film Inspector Clouseau (1968) starring Alan Arkin as Clouseau, is generally not considered by fans to be part of the series canon, since it involved neither Sellers nor Edwards. However, some elements of Arkin's performance and costuming of Clouseau were retained when Peter Sellers resumed the role of Return in 1975. Despite speculation, Alan Arkin does not appear in Trail of the Pink Panther.

2000s film series
The film that launched the second Pink Panther series, The Pink Panther, starring Steve Martin as Clouseau, directed by Shawn Levy and produced by Robert Simonds, was released in February 2006 by Metro-Goldwyn-Mayer and was co-produced with Columbia Pictures. It is set in the present day and introduces different main characters, therefore belonging to a different continuity. Martin also stars in the sequel, The Pink Panther 2, released in 2009.

Reception

Box office performance

Critical and public response

Cartoons

The opening title sequence in the original 1963 The Pink Panther film was such a success with the United Artists executives that they decided to adapt the title sequence into a series of theatrical animated shorts. DePatie–Freleng Enterprises, run by former Warner Bros. Cartoons creators David H. DePatie and Isadore "Friz" Freleng, produced the opening sequences, with Freleng as director. United Artists commissioned a long series of The Pink Panther shorts, the first of which, 1964's The Pink Phink, won the 1964 Academy Award for Animated Short Film. This was the first (and to date only) time a studio's first work won an Oscar.

By the autumn of 1969, the shorts were being broadcast on NBC during Saturday mornings on The Pink Panther Show; after 1969, new shorts were produced for both television broadcast and theatrical release. A number of sister series also joined the Pink Panther character on movie screens and on the airwaves, including The Inspector, featuring a comical French police officer based on the Jacques Clouseau character.

Traditionally mute, the Pink Panther was given the voice of actor Matt Frewer for a 1993-1996 animated TV series.

The animated Pink Panther character has also appeared in computer and console video games, as well as advertising campaigns for several companies, most notably for Owens Corning Fiberglass insulation. There was also a short-lived animated series called Pink Panther and Pals (2010) which is aimed at younger children. In 2014, MGM announced (see above) that it was planning an animation / live-action hybrid film reboot of the franchise, to be directed by David Silverman and produced by Walter Mirisch and Julie Andrews. But in November 2020, it was later announced that Jeff Fowler will direct the movie instead with Mirisch and Andrews still producing.
The animated Pink Panther character also appeared in a short animated segment on the educational TV series Sesame Street, demonstrating his karate skills to carve the letter K out of a block of stone, only for it to crumble quickly afterward.

Canceled projects

Romance of the Pink Panther
Romance of the Pink Panther was to have been the seventh film in the franchise, and written by Peter Sellers and Jim Moloney. Due to a rift between Blake Edwards and Sellers, Edwards would not have directed the film. The basic plot was to involve Inspector Clouseau becoming smitten with a cat burglar called "the Frog", played by Pamela Stephenson. Two drafts of the screenplay were written before Sellers' death, each with different endings. Shortly after Sellers' death in July 1980, it was reported that  Dudley Moore  might play Clouseau, but Blake Edwards instead chose to introduce a new character in the series, rather than recast the role of Clouseau.  Both  Clive Donner and Sidney Poitier were reported at various times to be directing the movie, with Donner's name in that role on the cover sheet of the July 16, 1980 'final draft' script.

See also
 Pink Panthers, the name given by Interpol to a group of Montenegrin thieves who successfully executed several jewel heists starting in 1993.
 The Pink Panthers, a name used for several different LGBT rights organizations in North America since the 1970s.

References

External links

 The Pink Panther via Metro-Goldwyn-Mayer's website
 

 
Amazon (company) franchises
Film series introduced in 1963
American film series
Metro-Goldwyn-Mayer franchises
Windows games